The Mongolia national under-17 football team is the national U-17 football team of Mongolia. It is operated under the auspices of the Mongolian Football Federation and is a member of the Asian Football Confederation.

Results and fixtures

2019

2022

Competition History

Performance at the AFC U-17 Asian Cup 
  1985 : DNE
  1986 : DNE
  1988 : DNE
  1990 : DNE
  1992 : DNE
  1994 : DNE
  1996 : DNE
  1998 : DNE
  2000 : DNQ
  2002 : DNQ
  2004 : DNQ
  2006 : DNQ
  2008 : DNQ
  2010 : Withdrew
  2012 : DNE
  2014 : DNE
  2016 : DNQ
  2018 : DNQ
   2020 :  DNQ cancelled
  2023 :  DNQ

Performance at the FIFA U-17 World Cup 
 1985 to 1999: Did Not Enter
 2001 to 2009: Did Not Qualify
 2011: Withdrew
 2013 to 2015 : Did Not Enter
 2017 to 2021: Did Not Qualify
 2023 : Did Not Qualify

References

External links
MFF Official website
Soccerway

u17
Asian national under-17 association football teams